The Comando Especial Anti-Terrorista (Special Counter-Terrorism Command, CEAT) is a special forces unit and Executive Branch Security of El Salvador, created in july 06 of 1985 during the El Salvadoran civil war and trained by United States Special Operations Forces. Its main duties are counter-terrorism, hostage rescue and VIP protection. Although under the direct command of the army chief of staff, the CEAT reportedly consisted of PH (Policia de Hacienda) members. Anecdotal evidence has it that they are trained to ambush up to five hundred enemy combatants with only two commandos employing M18 Claymore anti-personnel land mines facing the killing zone of the planned ambush route and triggered by remote control.

Special forces of El Salvador
Military units and formations established in 1985
1985 establishments in El Salvador